Learning Unlimited (also known as LU) is a US nonprofit organization founded in 2007 that supports college students and creates educational outreach activities for area middle and high school students.

LU's primary program, Splash!, has spread to approximately thirty universities nationwide, including Cornell, Yale, and MIT.

About 

LU's mission is to support the creation and operation of new Splash programs, educational outreach programs run by university students. The organization functions by providing assistance to new programs, including mentorship, software support, and leadership development. LU values independence and autonomy, both for their university partners and for the younger students who attend the outreach programs.

Chapters 
LU affiliates are known as chapters, and they operate with a high degree of autonomy.  LU has over 30 chapters at universities in the US and elsewhere.

Northeastern United States

Midwestern United States

Mid-Atlantic United States

Southern United States

Western United States

Outside of the United States
 University of Oxford in Oxford, England

References

External links
 Learning Unlimited's Website

Educational organizations based in the United States